Shirley Anne Cripps  (born September 11, 1935) was a provincial level politician from Alberta, Canada. She served as a member of the Legislative Assembly of Alberta from 1979 to 1989. During her time in the Alberta Legislature she served in the Executive Council of Alberta from 1986 to 1989.

Political career
Cripps ran for a seat to the Alberta Legislature for the first time in the 1979 Alberta general election. She won the electoral district of Drayton Valley to hold it for the governing Progressive Conservative caucus. She was easily re-elected in the 1982 Alberta general election with a larger plurality defeating two other candidates. She was run for her third and final term in the 1986 Alberta general election. Cripps won the biggest margin of victory in her political career. After the election she was appointed Associate Minister of Agriculture by Premier Don Getty. She served that until her retirement at the dissolution of the Legislature in 1989.

References

External links
Legislative Assembly of Alberta Members Listing

Progressive Conservative Association of Alberta MLAs
1935 births
Living people
Members of the Executive Council of Alberta
Women MLAs in Alberta
Women government ministers of Canada